Kuçovë District was one of the 36 districts of Albania, which were dissolved in July 2000 and replaced by 12 counties. It is in the centre of the country, and its capital was the former municipality of Kuçovë (which in 2015 became a sub-unit of the larger municipality of the same name). Its territory is now part of Berat County: the municipality of Kuçovë (partly).

Administrative divisions
The district consists of the following municipalities:

Kozare
Kuçovë
Perondi

Note: - urban municipalities in bold

Description
Kuçovë is one of the main centres of the Albanian oil industry, and the town of Kuçovë was built with Soviet assistance in the 1950s. It is of interest to students of communist architecture and planning, although much of the oil infrastructure predates the communist period and was installed by the Italians during the Zogist period. Today all of the oil wells are functioning, and in some places oil seeps to the surface. Kuçovë has had the largest Oil reserves in Albania and there is currently a lot of Oil unexplored. The Communist regime build Kuçovë into an industrial city, among the most industrialized in the country, but the current regime, just takes the Oil produced there and doesn't invest any money in its infrastructure.

The town has suffered very badly during the post-communist period, and there are many abandoned factories and power plants in and around the town, and it is visibly poorer than the neighbouring towns such as Berat. There is little to interest the casual tourist, and facilities for the visitor are poor even by local standards - tourists would be better advised to explore Kucove from Berat.

Kuçovë was formerly a closed military district, and the airbase at Kuçovë remains one of the largest in Albania and aged MiG fighters of 1950s vintage could be seen flying on a regular basis until they were finally grounded in late 2005.

References

Districts of Albania
Geography of Berat County